The Celebes shrew-rat (Crunomys celebensis) is a species of rodent in the family Muridae. It is found only in Sulawesi, Indonesia. Its natural habitat is subtropical or tropical dry forests. It is threatened by habitat loss.

References

Crunomys
Rodents of Sulawesi
Mammals described in 1982
Taxonomy articles created by Polbot